At Jazz Jamboree Warszawa '91: A Tribute to Miles is a live album by trumpeter Freddie Hubbard recorded in October 1991 and released on the Starburst label in 2000. It features performances by Hubbard, Ronnie Mathews, Don Braden, Jeff Chambers and Ralph Penland.

Reception
The Allmusic review by Ken Dryden states "Although Hubbard's group provides sufficient support, the trumpeter's earlier recordings are far superior to this disappointing release... This CD can safely be bypassed"

Track listing 
 "Bolivia" (Cedar Walton) - 12:59
 "God Bless the Child" (Arthur Herzog Jr., Billie Holiday) - 12:53
 "All Blues" (Miles Davis) - 17:10
 "Dear John" (Freddie Hubbard) - 17:01
Recorded at the Jazz Jamboree Warszawa on October 24, 1991

Personnel 
 Freddie Hubbard - trumpet
 Don Braden - tenor saxophone
 Ronnie Mathews - piano
 Jeff Chambers - bass
 Ralph Penland - drums

References 

1992 live albums
Freddie Hubbard live albums
Miles Davis tribute albums